Katangi railway station (station code KGE) is a railway station in Katangi block of Balaghat district in Madhya Pradesh, India. It is on a broad-gauge network, in the South East Central Railway zone. It is connected with Waraseoni, Balaghat, and Gondia.

Stations between Katangi and Gondia 
 Katangi
 Lakhanwara
 Kochewahi
 Saongi
 Waraseoni
 Kaydi
 Garra
 Balaghat
 Kanhadgaon
 Hatta Road
 Khara (p.h.)
 Birsola
 Gatra
 Pratap bagh
 Nagradham
 Gondia

References 

Railway stations in Balaghat district